XtreemFS is an object-based, distributed file system for wide area networks. XtreemFS' outstanding feature is full (all components) and real (all failure scenarios, including network partitions) fault tolerance, while maintaining POSIX file system semantics. Fault-tolerance is achieved by using Paxos-based lease negotiation algorithms and is used to replicate files and metadata. SSL and X.509 certificates support make XtreemFS usable over public networks.

XtreemFS has been under development since early 2007. A first public release was made in August 2008. XtreemFS 1.0 was released in August 2009. The 1.0 release includes support for read-only replication with failover, data center replica maps, parallel reads and writes, and a native Windows client. The 1.1 added automatic on-close replication and POSIX advisory locks. In mid-2011, release 1.3 added read/write replication for files. Version 1.4 underwent extensive testing and is considered production-quality. An improved Hadoop integration and support for SSDs was added in version 1.5.

XtreemFS is funded by the European Commission's IST programme.

The original XtreemFS team founded Quobyte Inc. in 2013. Quobyte offers a professional storage system as a commercial product.

Features
 Secure connections to Contrail (software)
 Clients for Linux, Windows and OS X
 Open source (New BSD License since release 1.3)
 Cross-site file replication with auto-failover
 Partial replicas, objects fetched on demand
 POSIX compatibility
 Plugins for authentication policies, replica selection
 RAID0 (striping) with parallel I/O over stripes
 Read-only replication
 Security (SSL, X.509 certificates)
 Servers for Linux and Solaris Natively and Non-Native Windows Java & ANT based server.
 experimental file system driver for Hadoop (added in version 1.2)

Use cases
 as a filer replacement (home directories and group shares),
 in HPC cluster,
 in Hadoop clusters,
 for VM block storage
 cross-branch data sharing
 and many more use cases, all in a single system.

See also

 List of file systems, the distributed parallel fault-tolerant file system section
 Grid computing
 XtreemOS
 BeeGFS

References

External links
 XtreemFS website
 XtreemFS project on GitHub.com

Distributed file systems
Distributed file systems supported by the Linux kernel
Network file systems
Userspace file systems
Software using the BSD license